Benoît Bachelet (born 6 November 1974) is a French former ice hockey right winger. He competed in the men's tournament at the 2002 Winter Olympics.

References

External links

1974 births
Living people
Brûleurs de Loups players
French ice hockey right wingers
Olympic ice hockey players of France
Ice hockey players at the 2002 Winter Olympics
People from Gap, Hautes-Alpes
Sportspeople from Hautes-Alpes